Carparachne is a genus of Namibian huntsman spiders that was first described by R. F. Lawrence in 1962.  it contains two species, found in Namibia: C. alba and C. aureoflava. The golden wheel spider (C. aureoflava) uses cartwheeling to move across hot, sandy ground, similar to the related Cebrennus rechenbergi, which uses a flic-flac motion.

See also
 List of Sparassidae species

References

Araneomorphae genera
Endemic fauna of Namibia
Sparassidae
Spiders of Africa